John Hanna may refer to:

John Hanna (ice hockey) (1935–2005), Montreal Canadiens hockey player
John Clark Hanna, founder of the original ELF
John A. Hanna (1762–1805), United States Representative from Pennsylvania
John Hanna (Indiana politician) (1827–1882), United States Representative from Indiana
John Hanna (baseball) (1863–1930), 19th century major league baseball catcher
John G. Hanna (1889–1948), sailboat designer
John William Hanna (1889–1962), Canadian merchant and politician
John Hanna (prison officer) (c. 1947–1992), Northern Irish prison officer convicted of helping the IRA murder a colleague
John Hanna (rower), British rower
Jack Hanna (born 1947), American zookeeper

See also
John Hannah (disambiguation)